The 1984 Skate Canada International was held in Victoria, British Columbia on October 25–27. Medals were awarded in the disciplines of men's singles, ladies' singles, pair skating, and ice dancing.

Results

Men

Ladies

Pairs

Ice dancing

References

Skate Canada International, 1984
Skate Canada International
1984 in Canadian sports 
1984 in British Columbia